517 Squadron or 517th Squadron may refer to:

 No. 517 Squadron RAF, a unit of the United Kingdom Royal Air Force 
 517th Airlift Squadron, a unit of the United States Air Force
 517th Strategic Fighter Squadron, a unit of the United States Air Force